Chenchu Lakshmi is a 1958 Indian bilingual Telugu and Tamil language Hindu mythological film, produced and directed by B. A. Subba Rao. It stars Akkineni Nageswara Rao and Anjali Devi, with music composed by S. Rajeswara Rao. It was simultaneously shot in Telugu and Tamil, most of the scenes and artists are same in both the versions, it was also made earlier in 1943 with different cast and crew.

Plot
The film is based on the Hindu puranic story which begins with the marriage ceremony of Lord Vishnu (Akkineni Nageswara Rao) & Goddess Lakshmi (Anjali Devi). During, Sage Durvasa (Gummadi) becomes furious as he is uninvited. So, he curses Mahalakshmi's parents, Samudra (E. R. Sahadevan) & his wife (Sandhya) to born as tribals. After some time, Vishnu kills Hiranyaksha, donning Varaha avatar. Learning it, his brother Hiranyakasipa (S. V. Ranga Rao) a ferocious, performs a huge penance. Exploiting it, Indra kidnaps his pregnant wife Leelavathi (Pushpavalli) to destroy his heir. Thereupon, Sage Narada (Relangi) safeguards her at his Ashram where he sculpts Prahlada (Master Babji) on her womb as an ardent devotee of Lord Vishnu. Meanwhile, Hiranyakasipa succeeds in his penance and gets a boon Lord Brahma that absence of death any weapon, human, animal, demon or divinity. Now, he occupies Indra the entire universe and moves in search of Vishnu who absconds along with Lakshmi. At present, Vishnu transforms the glow of Lakshmi into fruit and plants it on a tree. Parallelly, Samudra & his wife take birth as the tribals but they are perturbed as childless. So, Sage Narada makes a play, by bestowing them the fruit of Lakshmi's glow when the couple is blessed with a baby girl Chenchita (again Anjali Devi). Besides, Prahlada worships towards Vishnu reaches esteem and Hiranyakasipa makes several attempts to bar him but fails. Ultimately, he challenges to show his God when Vishnu appears from the pillar as Lord Narasimha half man & half lion and slays Hiranyakasipa. Here, Narasimha still raging with fury and no-one could make him calm including Lakshmi because she does not contain the glow. During that plight, Narasimha is acquainted with fearless Chenchita one that subsides his anger and turns into the handsome Narahari. Currently, they fall in love and couples up. Being cognizant of it, enraged Lakshmi displays grievance when both the wives squabble. At last, Narada affirms Chenchita as her glow when they conjoin and Samudra & his wife are also relieved from the curse. Finally, the movie ends on a happy note with the reunion of Lord Vishnu & Goddess Lakshmi at Vaikuntha.

Cast

Telugu Cast
Akkineni Nageswara Rao as Lord Vishnu
Anjali Devi as Goddess Lakshmi & Chenchita (Dual role)
S. V. Ranga Rao as Hiranyakashipu
Gummadi as Durvasa
Relangi as Narada Maharshi
Nagabhushanam as Lord Shiva
E. R. Sahadevan as Samudrudu
Vangara as Chandamarkula
Rushyendramani
Sandhya as Queen of the Chenchus
Pushpavalli as Leelavathi
E. V. Saroja as Dancer
Master Babji as Prahlada

Tamil Cast

A. Nageswara Rao as Lord Vishnu
Anjali Devi as Goddess Lakshmi/Chenchita
S. V. Ranga Rao as Hiranyakashipu
Pushpavalli as Leelavathi
K. A. Thangavelu as  Saint Narada Maharshi 
E. R. Sahadevan as King of the Chenchus
Sandhya as Queen of the Chenchus
Nagabhushanam as Lord Shiva
Rushyendramani  
C. V. V. Panthulu as Durvasa
Vangara Venkata Subbaiah as Chandamarkula
A. V. Subba Rao
Nalla Rama Murthy 
K. S. Angamuthu
Master Babji as Prahlada

Soundtrack

Music was composed by S. Rajeswara Rao.  All the tunes for all the songs for both languages are the same.

Tamil Songs
Lyrics by Papanasam Sivan, Thanjai N. Ramaiah Dass & M. S. Subramaniam.

The 1943 film
Chenchu Lakshmi was made in 1943 directed by S. Soundararajan and starring C. H. Narayana Rao and Kamala Kotnis .

References

External links
 
 
 Listen to Chenchu Lakshmi songs at Telugufm.com.
 Chenchu Lakshmi songs at Raaga.com

1950s Telugu-language films
Indian multilingual films
1950s Tamil-language films
1958 films
Indian black-and-white films
Films about Hinduism
Films directed by B. A. Subba Rao